Dzyanis Myadzvedzew (born 26 January 1988) is a Belarusian former professional footballer.

Match fixing
On 20 February 2018, the BFF banned him from football for 24 months for his involvement in the match-fixing.

References

External links

1988 births
Living people
Belarusian footballers
Association football midfielders
FC Gomel players
FC SKVICH Minsk players
FC Khimik Svetlogorsk players
FC Rechitsa-2014 players
FC Luch Minsk (2012) players
FC Neman Stolbtsy players